Lira popular (Popular Lire), also called string literature, refers to the style of poetry written and printed in Chile in the late nineteenth and early twentieth centuries. Poets created a series of loose prints that circulated in urban areas. It was advertised and spread by hanging it from string hung in common areas between poles or from trees. Many of the people who wrote the poems were either peasants, or poets who used the voices and opinions of the people to comment on news or social events.

Themes 
Many of the poems in Lira popular are centered on themes such as misery, love, violence, murder, life, death, crime and religion. Poets chose these subjects to excite curiosity in readers where the accompanying illustrations depict the conditions and circumstances of their lives.

Printing 
Lira popular were printed in varying forms over time. The first popular pages measured 26 x 35cm in Chile. Over time, they grew to 54 x 38. Liras today are of similar size. Each sheet of a Lira consists of 5 to 8 poems with pictures and drawings usually created by the poets. The purpose of these drawings is to illustrate the work's theme. The accompanying pictures illustrate the poem's story. The two types of images seen in Lira popular are xylography, where rough artwork was sent to poets to be described in verse. The signature of the engraver was often omitted. However, Adolfo Reyes was responsible for many of the illustrations. He illustrated his verses using a penknife and raulí board. The second type of image is known as cliché. These old images weren’t always necessarily relevant to the content but were used simply as decoration. Titles of Lira popular are similar to titles in newspapers today, in a large font, to catch attention.

History 
In many Latin American countries, news traveled slowly, especially between Spain and Central and South America. Lira, aided by the printing press, allowed information to spread faster than just by word of mouth. In the beginning, Lira popular was used to allude to events in Spain and other countries. Still, over time it became more of a cultural trend, eventually used as a representation of a country’s experiences and events. To have their poetry published in Lira popular, poets were responsible for registering their names. They were in charge of making sure that their works were published and had to go out in public and work hard to sell those original works. In addition to signing his name (or a pseudonym), the poet often distributed copies in the streets where workers, peasants, and artisans could have access. As it was a largely illiterate group at the time, the images and public readings helped to attract people to hear the reading of the tenths out loud.

Timeline 
1541

Written poetic forms and other works are introduced in Chile, such as romances and counterpoint articles, through missionaries and writers, as well as imported books and documents.

1866

The War against Spain caused the appearance of the first poetic documents that talked about the news.

1879

The War of the Pacific is talked about by famous poets through the Popular Lira

1880

Bernardino Guajardo, considered the most essential famous Chilean poet of the nineteenth century, published poems in five volumes in the same form as Lira popular.

1891

Development and boom of the Lira popular.

1920

The printing of popular liras falls due to the expansion of the publishing and journalism industry. The first study on the Lira Popular, by the German ethnologist and linguist Rodolfo Lenz, is published in Chile.

1952 

Diego Muñoz and Inés Valenzuela begin publishing “Lira Popular” in newspapers with the contributions of many poets or “payadores.”

Collections 
Currently, there are three entire collections of Lira being displayed and held for public use. Of the three, two are shown at The Archive of Oral Literature and Popular Traditions at the National Library of Chile. The third is in the Andrés Bello Central Archive of the University of Chile. Over 850 sheets of Lira are preserved.

See also 
 Cordel literature

References 

Chilean literature